Patrick Ngcobo (died 1 February 2015) was a Carnatic classic musician born in Kloof (Gillets), Durban, South Africa. He belongs to the warrior Zulu tribe in KwaZulu-Natal province in South Africa. Although he was a Zulu singer he specialized in Indian classic music and could sing songs in seven languages including  Tamil, Kannada, Telugu, and Malayalam languages. His teacher was the famous Indian singer Dr. K. J. Yesudas.

He hosted  a regular show on Carnatic music on the South African radio station Lotus FM, the first Black South African to do so. He was an ambassador for South Africa's cross cultural diversity, and  he expressed himself fully through his love of classical Indian musical arts.

Ngcobo died on 1 February 2015 from kidney failure. On 11 April 2015, the Indian Consulate General and the Indian Cultural Centre in Durban, KwaZulu-Natal, held a memorial concert in his honor.  His amazing Classical Indian singing career, fostered under apartheid, was unfortunately cut short at 43 due to ill health.

References

 
 
 

Male Carnatic singers
Carnatic singers
20th-century South African male singers
2015 deaths
Zulu people
Year of birth missing
21st-century South African male singers